Alajdin Demiri ( December 19, 1954 – April  12, 2019)  was an Albanian politician, famous for his role as mayor in the 1997 uprising in Tetovo and Gostivar, by ethnic Albanians for which he was later sentenced to two years in prison.

Biography 
From 1973 until 1977, he studied sociology in Sarajevo, Bosnia. From 1977 to 1978, he worked in Skopje for the television station as a reporter and political commentator in the Albanian-language department. From 1978-1983 and 1983–1988, he taught sociology and philosophy at a high school in Tetovo and then worked at the town library, eventually being released from both professions for 'political reasons'. From 1990-1995, he studied French in Lausanne, Switzerland, eventually returning in 1995 to be the spokesman of PDP (Party for Democratic Prosperity).
As part of the PDP, he was elected mayor of Tetovo in 1997. He took part in the uprisings in 1997 and was sentenced to two years in prison for the uprising. The European Parliament called for his release, and he was freed under an Amnesty Law.

References

1954 births
2019 deaths
People from Tetovo
Mayors of places in North Macedonia
Albanians in North Macedonia